Wampus may refer to:

 Wampus cat, a cat-like creature in American folklore
 Wampus Multimedia, an American record label and media company founded by Mark Doyon
 Mountain wampus, a fictional creature in the 1983 video game M.U.L.E.
 Wampus Cats, an American blues band featuring Oscar "Buddy" Woods

See also
 Wumpus (disambiguation)